The 2016 United States presidential election in Montana was held on Tuesday, November 8, 2016, as part of the 2016 United States presidential election in which all 50 states plus the District of Columbia participated. Montana voters chose electors to represent them in the Electoral College via a popular vote, pitting the Republican Party's nominee, businessman Donald Trump, and running mate Indiana Governor Mike Pence against Democratic Party nominee, former Secretary of State Hillary Clinton, and her running mate Virginia Senator Tim Kaine. Montana has three electoral votes in the Electoral College.

Trump carried the state by a 20.5% margin of victory, exceeding Mitt Romney's 13.7% margin in 2012 and John McCain's 2.4% margin in 2008. Republicans have won Montana in every presidential election since 1996. Libertarian nominee and third-party candidate Gary Johnson received 5.6% of the vote.

This was Johnson's fifth strongest state, behind his native New Mexico as well as North Dakota, Alaska, and Oklahoma.

Primary elections

Democratic primary

Two candidates appeared on the Democratic presidential primary ballot:
 Bernie Sanders
 Hillary Clinton

Republican primary
Five candidates appeared on the Republican presidential primary ballot:
 Jeb Bush (withdrawn)
 Ted Cruz (withdrawn)
 John Kasich (withdrawn)
 Marco Rubio (withdrawn)
 Donald Trump

General election

Predictions

Results

Results by county
Preliminary general election results for president  by county. Totals exclude 2,621 write-in votes.

Counties that flipped from Democratic to Republican
 Blaine (largest city: Chinooko)
 Hill (largest city: Havre)
 Roosevelt (largest city: Wolf Point)

Counties that flipped from Republican to Democratic
 Gallatin (largest city: Bozeman)

By congressional district
Due to the state's low population, only one congressional district is allocated, the At-Large District. This district covers the entire state, and thus is equivalent to the statewide election results.

Analysis
Like every Republican nominee since 1996, Donald Trump carried Montana's three electoral votes. He won by a large margin, and he swept most of the plains counties in eastern Montana, traditionally the most conservative part of the state, by staggering margins sometimes exceeding 60 points. The eastern part of the state has benefited from the recent energy boom in neighboring North Dakota, and its populace is suspicious and disapproving of the environmental movement championed by Democrats in recent elections.

Most counties in the western part of the state were also traditionally Republican, with a ranching-based economy heavily dependent on the raising and production of cattle and hay, particularly in the counties bordering Idaho such as Beaverhead County and Ravalli County. However, an influx of retirees from the West Coast have made the western region more competitive in recent elections.

The only significant counties won by Clinton were Missoula County, where the city of Missoula is located, Gallatin County, where Bozeman is located, and Big Horn County and Glacier County, which are both majority Native American. While sweeping most of the rural, majority white conservative counties of the state, Trump also won in Lewis and Clark County where the capital city of Helena is located, in neighboring Cascade County where Great Falls is located, and in Yellowstone County where the city of Billings is located.

Trump became the first Republican to win the White House without carrying Gallatin County since William McKinley in 1900.

See also
 United States presidential elections in Montana
 Presidency of Donald Trump
 2016 Democratic Party presidential debates and forums
 2016 Democratic Party presidential primaries
 2016 Republican Party presidential debates and forums
 2016 Republican Party presidential primaries

References

External links
 RNC 2016 Republican Nominating Process 
 Green papers for 2016 primaries, caucuses, and conventions

MY
2016
Presidential